Marina Kovrigina (born 4 May 1972) is a Russian judoka. She competed in the women's half-lightweight event at the 1996 Summer Olympics.

References

External links
 

1972 births
Living people
Russian female judoka
Olympic judoka of Russia
Judoka at the 1996 Summer Olympics
Sportspeople from Krasnoyarsk
20th-century Russian women